Thomas Charles O'Reilly (February 22, 1873 – March 25, 1938) was an American prelate of the Roman Catholic Church who served as bishop of the Diocese of Scranton in Pennsylvania from 1928 to 1938.

Biography

Early life 
O'Reilly was born in Cleveland, Ohio, to Patrick and Delia (née Readdy) O'Reilly. After attending Spencerian Business College (1887-1888), he studied at St. Ignatius College (1889-1893) and St. Mary's Seminary (1893-1894) in Cleveland. He then furthered his studies at the Pontifical North American College in Rome.

Priesthood 
O'Reilly was ordained to the priesthood for the Diocese of Cleveland by Cardinal Francesco di Paola Cassetta on June 4, 1898. In 1899, he earned a Doctor of Sacred Theology from the Propaganda University in Rome

Upon returning to Ohio, O'Reilly served as a curate at St. John's Cathedral until 1901, when he became professor of dogmatic theology at St. Mary's Seminary. He earned a Doctor of Laws in 1909 from the University of Notre Dame. He was chancellor (1909-1916) and vicar general (1916-1921) of the diocese before serving as pastor of the Cathedral of St. John the Evangelist.

Bishop of Scranton 
On December 16, 1927, O'Reilly was appointed the third Bishop of Scranton, Pennsylvania, by Pope Pius XI. He received his episcopal consecration on February 16, 1928 from Cardinal Dennis Joseph Dougherty, with Bishops Joseph Schrembs and Bernard Joseph Mahoney serving as co-consecrators. During his tenure, he established seven parishes and fourteen schools in the diocese, despite the economic ravages of the Great Depression.

However, the increased burden of responsibility took its toll on his health, and his tenure was correspondingly shortened. O'Reilly later died in Miami Beach, Florida, aged 65.

References

1873 births
1938 deaths
Saint Mary Seminary and Graduate School of Theology alumni
University of Notre Dame alumni
Religious leaders from Cleveland
Roman Catholic Diocese of Cleveland
20th-century Roman Catholic bishops in the United States
Contributors to the Catholic Encyclopedia